The history of the Jews in Serbia is some two thousand years old. The Jews first arrived in the region during Roman times. The Jewish communities of the Balkans remained small until the late 15th century, when Jews fleeing the Spanish and Portuguese Inquisitions found refuge in the Ottoman-ruled areas, including Serbia.

The community flourished and reached a peak of 33,000 before World War II (of which almost 90% were living in Belgrade and Vojvodina). About two-thirds of Serbian Jews were murdered in The Holocaust, having been particularly targeted as Hitler sought to punish both ethnic Serbs and Jews for German defeat in World War I. After the war, a great part of the remaining Jewish Serbian population emigrated, chiefly into Israel. In the 2011 census only 787 people declared themselves as Jewish. Today, the Belgrade Synagogue and the Subotica Synagogue, once the fourth largest synagogue building in Europe, are the two in-service synagogues, while the Novi Sad Synagogue has been converted into a cultural art space.

History

Ancient times
Jews first arrived on the territory of present-day Serbia in Roman times, although there is little documentation prior to the 10th century.

Ottoman rule

The Jewish communities of the Balkans were boosted in the 15th and 16th centuries by the arrival of Jewish refugees fleeing the Spanish and Portuguese Inquisitions. Sultan Bayezid II of the Ottoman Empire welcomed the Jewish refugees into his Empire. Jews became involved in trade between the various provinces in the Ottoman Empire, becoming especially important in the salt trade. In 1663, the Jewish population of Belgrade was 800.

While the rest of modern-day Serbia was still ruled by the Ottoman Empire, territory of present-day Vojvodina was part of the Habsburg monarchy. In 1782, Emperor Joseph II issued the Edict of Tolerance, giving Jews some measure of religious freedom. The Edict attracted Jews to many parts of the Monarchy. The Jewish communities of Vojvodina flourished, and by the end of the 19th century the region had nearly 40 Jewish communities.

Independent Serbia and Habsburg Vojvodina
Many Jews were involved in the struggle of Serbs for independence from the Ottoman Empire, by supplying arms to the local Serbs, and the Jewish communities faced brutal reprisal attacks from the Ottoman Turks. In 1804, when Karađorđe's forces invaded the fortress of Smederevo from the Ottomans, the Jews were expelled from Šabac and Požarevac. The independence struggle lasted until 1830, when Serbia gained its independence.

After Belgrade was liberated, the Jews fell victim to decades of discriminatory taxes and restrictions on the choice of residence. During the liberation of Belgrade, contrary to the strict orders issued by Serb leader Karađorđe, some of the rebels destroyed Jewish shops and synagogues. Some Jews were killed and a part of them was forcibly baptised. At the same time in the interior of Serbia rebels expelled Jews from towns and small places.

House of Obrenović
With the reclamation of the Serbian throne by the Royal House of Obrenović under Miloš Obrenović in 1858, restrictions on Jewish merchants were again relaxed for some time, but only three years later they faced isolation and humiliation. In 1861 Mihailo III inherited the throne and reinstated anti-Jewish restrictions. In 1839, Jews were forbidden to open shops on Sundays and during Serbian holidays, causing them great damage because their shops were closed on Saturdays and all Jewish holidays. In 1877 a Jewish candidate was elected to the National Assembly for the first time, after receiving the backing of all parties.

In the 1860s-70s, a part of Serbian newspaper began publishing anti-Jewish articles resulting in threats being raised against the Jews. In 1862, a fight broke out between the Austrians and Serbians and Jews in Belgrade had their rights revoked, similar to local uprisings in the 1840s.

In 1879, the "Serbian-Jewish Singer Society" was founded in Belgrade as a part of the Serbian-Jewish friendship. During World War I and World War II the choir was not allowed to perform. It renamed "Baruch Brothers Choir" in 1950 and is one of the oldest Jewish choirs in the world still in existence. The choir remains a symbol of community unification, although only 20% of the choir members are actually Jewish due to the dwindling Jewish population in the country (in World War II, half of the Jewish population of Serbia was killed). By 1912, the Jewish community of Kingdom of Serbia stood at 5,000. Serbian-Jewish relations reached a high degree of cooperation during World War I, when Jews and Serbs fought side by side against the Central Powers. 132 Jews died in the Balkan Wars and World War I and in their honour a monument to them was erected in Belgrade at the Jewish Sephardic cemetery.

The waxing and waning of the fortunes of the Jewish community according to the ruler continued to the end of the 19th century, when the Serbian parliament lifted all anti-Jewish restrictions in 1889.

Jews in modern-day North Macedonia got their full citizen rights for the first time when the region became a part of Kingdom of Serbia.

Kingdom of Yugoslavia

In the aftermath of World War I, Montenegro, Banat, Bačka, Syrmia, and Baranja joined Serbia through popular vote in those regions, and this Greater Serbia then united with State of Slovenes, Croats and Serbs (from which Syrmia had seceded to join Serbia) to form the Kingdom of Serbs, Croats and Slovenes, which was soon renamed Kingdom of Yugoslavia. Serbia's relatively small Jewish community of 13,000 (including 500 in Kosovo), combined with the large Jewish communities of the other Yugoslav territories, numbering some 51,700. In the inter-war years (1919–1939), the Jewish communities of the Kingdom of Yugoslavia flourished.

Prior to World War II, some 31,000 Jews lived in Vojvodina. In Belgrade, Jewish community was 10,000-strong, 80% being Ladino-speaking Sephardi Jews, and 20% being Yiddish-speaking Ashkenazi Jews.

The Vidovdan Constitution guaranteed equality to Jews, and the law regulated their status as a religious community.

World War II

The Kingdom of Yugoslavia attempted to maintain neutrality during the period preceding World War II. Milan Stojadinović, the prime minister, tried to actively woo Adolf Hitler while maintaining the alliance with former Entente Powers, UK and France. Nonwithstanding overtures to Germany, Yugoslav policy was not anti-Semitic: for instance, Yugoslavia opened its borders to Austrian Jews following the Anschluss. Under increasing pressure to yield to German demands for safe passage of its troops to Greece, Yugoslavia signed the Tripartite Pact with Germany and Italy, like Bulgaria and Hungary. Unlike the other two, however, the signatory government of Maček and Cvetković was overthrown three days later in a British-supported coup of patriotic, anti-German generals. The new government immediately rescinded the Yugoslav signature on the Pact and called for strict neutrality. German response was swift and brutal: Belgrade was bombed without the declaration of war on 6 April 1941 and German, Italian, Hungarian and Bulgarian troops invaded Yugoslavia.

The Holocaust

In Serbia, German occupiers established concentration camps and extermination policies with the assistance of the puppet government of Milan Nedić.

The Nazi genocide against Yugoslav Jews began in April 1941. The state of Serbia was completely occupied by the Nazis. The main race laws in the State of Serbia were adopted on 30 April 1941: the Legal Decree on Racial Origins (Zakonska odredba o rasnoj pripadnosti). Jews from Srem were sent to Croatian camps, as were many Jews from other parts of Serbia. In rump Serbia, Germans proceeded to round up Jews of Banat and Belgrade, setting up a concentration camp across the river Sava, in the Syrmian part of Belgrade, then given to Independent State of Croatia. The Sajmište concentration camp was established to process and eliminate the captured Jews and Serbs. As a result, Emanuel Schäfer, commander of the Security Police and Gestapo in Serbia, famously cabled Berlin after last Jews were killed in May 1942:

"Serbien ist judenfrei."

Similarly. Harald Turner of the SS stated in 1942 that:

"Serbia is the only country in which the Jewish question and the Gypsy question has been solved."

By the time Serbia and Yugoslavia were liberated in 1944, most of the Serbian Jewry had been murdered. Of the 82,500 Jews of Yugoslavia alive in 1941, only 14,000 (17%) survived the Holocaust. Of the Jewish population of 16,000 in the territory controlled by Nazi puppet government of Milan Nedić, police and secret services murdered approximately 14,500.

There was a similar persecution of Jews in the territory of present-day Vojvodina, which was annexed by Hungary. In the 1942 raid in Novi Sad, the Hungarian troops killed many Jewish and non-Jewish Serb civilians in Bačka.

Historian Christopher Browning who attended the conference on the subject of Holocaust and Serbian involvement stated:

Serbian civilians were involved in saving thousands of Yugoslavian Jews during this period. Miriam Steiner-Aviezer, a researcher into Yugoslavian Jewry and a member of Yad Vashem's Righteous Gentiles committee states: "The Serbs saved many Jews." Currently, Yad Vashem recognizes 131 Serbians as Righteous Among Nations, the highest number among Balkan countries.

Socialist Yugoslavia

The Federation of Jewish Communities in Yugoslavia was formed in the aftermath of World War II to coordinate the Jewish communities of post-war Yugoslavia and to lobby for the right of Jews to immigrate to Israel. More than half of Yugoslav survivors chose to immigrate to Israel after World War II.

The Jewish community of Serbia, and indeed of all constituent republics in Yugoslavia, was maintained by the unifying power of the Federation of Jewish Communities in Yugoslavia. However, this power ended with the breakup of Yugoslavia in the 1990s.

Yugoslav wars
Prior to the Yugoslav Wars in the 1990s, approximately 2,500 Jews lived in Serbia, mostly in Belgrade.

The Jews of Serbia lived relatively peacefully in Yugoslavia between World War II and the 1990s. However, the end of the Cold War saw the breakup of Yugoslavia, and the ensuing civil wars.

During the Yugoslav Wars, and international sanctions many Jews chose to immigrate to Israel and the United States. During the NATO bombing in 1999, the Federation of Jewish Communities in Yugoslavia relocated many of Belgrade's Jewish elderly, women and children to Budapest, Hungary for their safety; many of them emigrated permanently.

David Bruce Macdonald states that Serbian nationalists used Jewish imagery, such as the Legend of Masada, in order to justify claims of Kosovo by comparing anti-semitism and serbophobia. This theory is supported by Jovan Byford who writes that Serbian nationalists used the Jewish question for the martyrdom myth characteristic of Serbian nationalist discourse in the 1980s.

Contemporary Serbia
Manifestations of antisemitism in Serbia are relatively rare and isolated. According to the US State Department Report on Human Rights practices in Serbia for 2006: "Jewish leaders in Serbia reported rare incidents of anti-Semitism, including anti-Semitic graffiti, vandalism, small circulation anti-Semitic books, and Internet postings", incidents which must be viewed in the context of small but growing anti-Semitism in Serbia. In 2013, downtown Belgrade was covered by posters, reportedly distributed by the Serbian branch of Blood & Honour, accusing Jews of being responsible for the 1999 bombing of the former Yugoslavia.

The Serbian government recognizes Judaism as one of the seven "traditional" religious communities of Serbia. The only remaining functioning synagogues in Serbia is the Belgrade Synagogue and Subotica Synagogue.

Demographics

Censuses:

 1953: 1,504
 1961: 1,250
 1971: 1,128
 1981: 683
 1991: 1,107
 2002: 1,185 (excluding Kosovo)
 2011: 787 (excluding Kosovo)

In the 2011 census 787 people declared themselves as Jewish, while 578 stated their religion as Judaism. About half of them live in Belgrade alone, while almost all the rest are found in Vojvodina (especially in its three largest cities: Novi Sad, Subotica and Pančevo). The results of the 2002 census based on ethnicity and 2011 census based on religion are displayed below:

Notable people 

 David Albahari, writer
 David Albala, military officer, physician, diplomat, and Jewish community leader
 Albert Bogen (Albert Bógathy; 1882–1961), Serbian-born Austrian Olympic silver medalist saber fencer
 Oskar Danon, composer
 Oskar Davičo, poet
 Filip David, playwright and columnist
 Jelena Đurović, writer, politician and journalist
 Predrag Ejdus, actor
 Vanja Ejdus, actress
 Rahela Ferari, actress
 Henrich-Haim Fingerhut, first radio speaker of Radio Belgrade
 Ivan Ivanji, writer
 Enriko Josif, composer
 Danilo Kiš, writer
 Geca Kon, publisher
 Marko Kon, pop singer
 Gordana Kuić, novelist
 Shaul Ladany, Israeli Olympian athlete
 Tommy Lapid, former Israeli politician of Hungarian extraction, born in Novi Sad
 Paulina Lebl-Albala, writer, feminist
 Sonja Licht, political activist
 Lior Narkis, Israeli singer (mother born in Serbia)
 Izidor Papo, cardiac surgeon, general-colonel of the Yugoslav Army medical unit
 Moša Pijade, politician, painter, art critic and publicist
 Dan Reisinger, Israeli graphic artist
 Seka Sablić, actress
 Erich Šlomović, art collector
 Aleksandar Tišma, writer
 Stanislav Vinaver, writer, poet, translator and journalist
 Mira Adanja Polak, journalist

See also  

 Israel–Serbia relations
 The Holocaust in Serbia
 Jewish Historical Museum, Belgrade

References 

 "Jews of Yugoslavia 1941 – 1945 Victims of Genocide and Freedom Fighters", by Jaša Romano, from the English summary in the book Jevreji Jugoslavije 1941–1945. Žrtve Genocida i učesnici Narodnooslobodilačkog Rata, Belgrade: Federation of Jewish Communities of Yugoslavia, 1980; pp. 573–590.

External links
 Jewish Virtual Library, Serbia and Montenegro
 Jews of the Former Yugoslavia After the Holocaust
 Synagogues Without Jews – Serbia and Croatia
 American Jewish Joint Distribution Committee, Serbia-Montenegro
  Jewish community of Belgrade
  Jewish community of Zemun (a district in Belgrade)
  Jewish Historical Museum in Belgrade
  www.semlin.info Website about the Semlin/Sajmište concentration camp and the Holocaust in Serbia
 Voices on Antisemitism Interview with David Albahari from the U.S. Holocaust Memorial Museum

 
Judaism in Serbia
Middle Eastern diaspora in Serbia